The Kagura are an ethnic and linguistic group based in  Tanzania.

References

Ethnic groups in Tanzania
Indigenous peoples of East Africa